Mercy Health Stadium is a baseball park in Avon, Ohio, United States. It is the home of the Lake Erie Crushers, a Frontier League team that began play in 2009.  The ballpark has a capacity of 5,000 people and opened on June 2, 2009, with the Crushers defeating the Windy City Thunderbolts, 5-2. The ballpark was known as All Pro Freight Stadium until January 2017; Sprenger Stadium until December 2019; and Crushers Stadium in 2020. The team announced in November 2020 that beginning January 1, 2021, the facility will be known as Mercy Health Stadium after a deal was signed with Mercy Health, a Cincinnati-based healthcare provider that operates facilities around the state of Ohio, including two hospitals in the nearby communities of Lorain and Oberlin.

Other uses

Cleveland State baseball
The Cleveland State Vikings baseball team played home games at the ballpark for the 2010 and 2011 seasons. After the 2011 season, however, Cleveland State dropped its baseball program.

Mid-American Conference tournament
From 2012 through 2019, the ballpark hosted the Mid-American Conference baseball tournament, held in late May. In its most recent setup, the top six teams in the MAC earned berths to the tournament, which used a double-elimination format over five days. The winner of the tournament earned the conference's automatic bid to the NCAA Division I baseball tournament. The 2020 tournament was also scheduled to be held at Crushers Stadium from May 20 through 24, but was cancelled in March 2020 due to the coronavirus pandemic. In May 2020, the Mid-American Conference announced that the baseball tournament was one of eight conference tournaments that were eliminated for at least the next four seasons beginning in 2020–21.

References

External links 
More on Ballpark
Reviews and Photos from BallparkReviews.com

Buildings and structures in Lorain County, Ohio
Minor league baseball venues
Cleveland State Vikings baseball
Baseball venues in Ohio
College baseball venues in the United States
Frontier League ballparks
Sports venues completed in 2009
2009 establishments in Ohio
Tourist attractions in Lorain County, Ohio